The Altaville Grammar School in Altaville, California is one of the oldest grammar schools in California. It was built in 1858 of brick in the Greek Revival style and remained in use until 1950, when it was replaced by the Mark Twain Elementary School in Altaville. After its abandonment, it fell into disrepair, but was restored in 1989 by the Calaveras County Historical Society. The building serves now as an example of a typical schoolroom of the 19th century.

The schoolhouse is registered as California Historical Landmark #499 and is listed on the National Register of Historic Places (NPS-1979000471).

References

External links
 Altaville Grammar School - Historical Marker Database with photos

History of Calaveras County, California
Educational institutions established in 1858
Educational institutions disestablished in 1950
Defunct schools in California
California Historical Landmarks
School buildings on the National Register of Historic Places in California
Greek Revival architecture in California
Schools in Calaveras County, California
1858 establishments in California
National Register of Historic Places in Calaveras County, California